Humayun Ahmed ( [ɦumaijun aɦmed]; 13 November 1948 – 19 July 2012) was a Bangladeshi novelist, dramatist, screenwriter, filmmaker, songwriter, scholar, and professor.His breakthrough was his debut novel Nondito Noroke published in 1972.He wrote over 200 fiction and non-fiction books, many of which were bestsellers in Bangladesh. His books were the top sellers at the Ekushey Book Fair during the 1990s and 2000s.He was one of the most famous and popular authors, dramatists, and filmmakers in post-independence Bangladesh since its independence. Dawn referred to him as the cultural legend of Bangladesh.

In the early 1990s, Ahmed emerged as a filmmaker. He went on to make a total of eight films – each based on his novels. He received six Bangladesh National Film Awards in different categories for the films Daruchini Dip, Aguner Poroshmoni, and Ghetuputra Komola. His works, such as Kothao Keu Nei, Aaj Robibar, and Srabon Megher Din, are still considered masterpieces by critics. He was one of the most influential writers in Bangladesh's history for 15 (1990–2005) years, when he wrote the most popular soap operas. Many Bangladeshi filmmakers are still inspired by his works. His films Shyamol Chhaya and Ghetuputra Komola were gradually submitted for the 78th Academy Awards and 85th Academy Awards in the Best Foreign Language Film category from Bangladesh..He has his own production company named Nuhash Chalachitra.

Widely regarded as the greatest Bangladeshi writer in history, He is considered one of the cornerstones in modern Bengali literature, his works are characterized by non-violence, realistic storylines, family drama, and humor styles. In recognition of the works of Humayun, The Times of india wrote, "Humayun was a custodian of the Bangladeshi literary culture whose contribution single-handedly shifted the capital of Bengali literature from Kolkata to Dhaka without any war or revolution." and entitled him "The Shakespeare of Bangladesh." Ahmed's writing style was characterized as "Magic Realism." Sunil Gangopadhyay described him as the most popular writer in the Bengali language for a century, and according to him, Ahmed was even more popular than Sarat Chandra Chattopadhyay.Ahmed's books have been the top sellers at the Ekushey Book Fair during every year of the 1990s and 2000s. He won the Bangla Academy Literary Award in 1981 and the Ekushey Padak in 1994 for his contribution to Bengali literature.

Early life and background
Ahmed was born on 13 November 1948 in Kutubpur village in the then Netrokona Mahakuma under Mymensingh District, East Bengal, Dominion of Pakistan (now in  Kendua Upazila, Netrokona District, Bangladesh). His mother, Ayesha Foyez (1930–2014), was a homemaker. His father, Foyzur Rahman Ahmed (1921–1971), was a sub-divisional police officer in Pirojpur District and was killed in 1971 during the Bangladesh Liberation War. In 2011, politician Delwar Hossain Sayeedi was put on trial for the killing but was acquitted of the charge in 2013 due to a lack of evidence. Humayun's brother, Muhammad Zafar Iqbal, is a writer and academician. Another brother, Ahsan Habib, is a cartoonist. He had three sisters – Sufia Haider, Momtaz Shahid and Rukhsana Ahmed.

During his childhood, Ahmed lived in Sylhet, Comilla, Chittagong, Bogra, Dinajpur and  where his father was on official assignment.

Education and early career
Ahmed studied in Chittagong Collegiate School. He passed the SSC examination from Bogra Zilla School in 1965. He then passed HSC from Dhaka College. Humayun Ahmed earned his bachelor's and master's degrees in chemistry from the University of Dhaka. He joined as a faculty member of the same university. Later he earned his PhD in polymer chemistry from North Dakota State University. He returned to Bangladesh and taught in the department of chemistry in University of Dhaka for several more years

Works

Novels 
Ahmed wrote his debut novel Nondito Noroke (In Blissful Hell) during the 1971 Bangladesh independence war while he was a university student. The novel was published in 1972 by the initiative of writer Ahmed Sofa under Khan Brother's Publishers. From his very first novel, his themes included the aspirations of average middle-class urban families and portrayed quintessential moments of their lives. His second novel was Shonkhonil Karagar.

Ahmed wrote fictional series featuring recurring characters such as Himu (21 novels), Misir Ali (19 novels and 11 short stories), Shuvro (6 novels) Other important non-rucurring characters are Baker Bhai, Tuni and more. He wrote several novels based on the Bangladesh Liberation War – Aguner Poroshmoni, Matal Hawa, Paap, 1971, Jochona O Jononir Golpo., and Deyal. He also wrote many romantic novels including Srabon Megher Din, Badol Diner Prothom Kodom Phool, Noboni, Krishnopoksho, Aj Dupure Tomar Nimontran, and Tumi Amai Dekechhile Chhutir Nimontrane. His novel Gouripur Junction was translated in nine languages.

Ahmed wrote autobiographies - Amar Chelebela, Ballpoint, Fountain Pen, Hiji-biji, Hotel Graver Inn, May Flower, Kath Pencil, Lilabotir Mrityu, New York-er Nil Akashe Jhokjhoke Rod and Rong Pencil.

Television and film 
Ahmed's first television drama was Prothom Prohor (1983), directed by Nawazish Ali Khan. His first drama serial was Ei Shob Din Ratri (1985). This was followed by the comedy series Bohubrihi (1988), the historical drama series Ayomoy (1988), the urban drama series Kothao Keu Nei (1990), Nokkhotrer Raat (1996), and Aaj Robibar (1999). In addition, he made single episode dramas, most notably Nimful (1997) and Badol Diner Prothom Kodom Ful. Recurring characters in dramas directed and screenplayed by him are Tara Tin Jon and Alauddiner Cherager Doitto.

Ahmed directed films based on his own stories. His first film, Aguner Poroshmoni (1994), based on the Bangladesh Liberation War, won the 19th Bangladesh National Film Awards in a total of eight categories, including the awards for the Best Film and the Best Director. Another film Shyamal Chhaya (2005) was also based on the same war. His last directed film, Ghetuputra Kamola (2012), the story of a teenage boy, was set in the British colonial period.

Shyamol Chhaya and Ghetuputra Kamola were selected as the Bangladeshi entries for the Academy Award for Best Foreign Language Film in 2006 and 2012 respectively, but were not nominated.

In 2009, Ahmed appeared as one of two judges for the reality television music competition show Khude Gaanraj.

Actor Affan Mitul debuted with his drama Nuruddin Swarna Padak. It was produced and directed by Humayun Ahmed himself.

Music
Ahmed composed around 40 songs which he used in his films and television dramas. The songs were based on the folk music of the north-eastern part of Bangladesh. His notable singles include "Ekta Chhilo Shonar Konya", "Pubali Batashey", "O Amar Ural Ponkhi Rey", "Jodi Mon Kadey", "Ke Porailo Amar Chokh-e Kolonko Kajol", "Chadni Poshor Raite Ke Anay Shoron Kore", "Ami Aaj Bhejabo Chokh Somudrer Joley", "Cholona Brishtitey Bhiji", "Channi Poshor Raite Jeno Amar Moron Hoy", "Hablonger Bajarey Giya", "Boroshar Prothom Dine", Thikana Amar Notebook E Ache", "Baje Bongshi", "Aaj Jorir Biye", "Cholo Na Jai", "Chika Maro" and "Konya Nachilo Rey" etc. The songs were rendered by Subir Nandi, Selim Chowdhury, S I Tutul, Meher Afroz Shaon, Sabina Yasmin, Agun, Kuddus Boyati and others. In his most films and TV dramas, the music composer was Maksud Jamil Mintu.

Critical response 
Nobel laureate economist Muhammad Yunus assessed Ahmed's overall impact saying: "Humayun's works are the most profound and most fruitful that literature has experienced since the time of Tagore and Nazrul." Similarly, according to poet Al Mahmud, "one golden age of Bengali literature ended with Tagore and Nazrul and another began" with Ahmed. Writer Imdadul Haq Milan considered him to be "the almighty lord of Bengali literature, controlling all their actions and thoughts". Dawn, Pakistan's oldest and most widely read English-language newspaper, referred to him as the cultural legend of Bangladesh. Times of India credited Humayun as "the person who single-handedly shifted the capital of Bengali literature from Kolkata to Dhaka". Sunil Gangopadhyay described him as the most popular writer in the Bengali language for a century and according to him, Ahmed was even more popular than Sarat Chandra Chattopadhyay. However, during his lifetime author Shahriar Kabir dismissed him for "always speaking for the establishment." Literary critic Azfar Hussain said: "I am not surprised he talks like a pro-establishment writer. I find him ignorant."

Controversy 
On 11 May 2012, two chapters of Ahmed's future novel Deyal were published in the daily Prothom Alo. 3 days later, Attorney General of Bangladesh Mahbubey Alam drew attention of the High Court on a discrepancy about a detail of the historical event of killing Sheikh Russel in Ahmed's writing. The court later issued a suo moto rule and asked the authorities to provide Ahmed copies of relevant documents and judgements of the killing case, so that Ahmed could rectify the writing.

Personal life
Ahmed married Gultekin Khan in 1973. Together they had three daughters: Nova Ahmed, Sheila Ahmed, Bipasha Ahmed and one son, Nuhash Humayun (born January 1, 1990). Sheila Ahmed went on to become a television and film actress and Nuhash became a writer, film director and producer. 700 Taka, Pizza Bhai were directed by him. He was one of the directors of Iti, Tomari Dhaka. Bipasha also acted in a supporting role in Nokkhotrer Raat and starred in Mayaboti. In 2003, Ahmed divorced Gultekin. He then married actress Meher Afroz Shaon in 2004. He had two sons from the second marriage, Nishad Humayun and Ninith Humayun. He also had a daughter with Shaon named Lilaboti who didn’t survive for very long. A lake in Nuhash Polli was named after the child. 

Ahmed was a Sunni Muslim, and he described the Islamic scholar Muhiuddin Khan as his father figure.

Death
Ahmed had open-heart surgery at Mount Elizabeth Hospital in Singapore. A few years later, during a routine checkup, doctors found a cancerous tumor in his colon. On 14 September 2011, he was flown to Memorial Sloan–Kettering Cancer Center in New York City for treatment. During his stay there, he wrote the novel, Deyal, based on the life of Sheikh Mujibur Rahman and Ziaur Rahman after the period of Bangladesh Liberation War. In January 2012, he was appointed as a senior special adviser of the Bangladesh Mission to the United Nations.

On 12 May 2012, Ahmed returned to Bangladesh for two weeks. He died on 19 July 2012 at 11:20 PM BST at Bellevue Hospital in New York City. There was some tension in the family over the selection of his burial site, but eventually his estate, Nuhash Palli was selected.

Nuhash Palli

In 1987, Ahmed founded an estate, Nuhash Palli, named after his son Nuhash, near Pirujali village, 25 km from Gazipur City, in Gazipur District, which grew to cover 40 bigha (approximately 14 acres). He would spend much of his time at the estate when he was in Bangladesh. He formed a collection of statues there by local artist Asaduzzaman Khan and another of plants from around the world, particularly medicinal and fruit-bearing trees.

Legacy
Exim Bank, a commercial bank and Anyadin, an entertainment magazine jointly introduced an award program, Humayun Ahmed Sahitya Puruskar, which would be conferred to two writers every year on Ahmed's birth anniversary – 12 November.

Several cinematographic adaptations of Ahmed's stories are made after his death. Anil Bagchir Ekdin (2015), directed by Morshedul Islam, won six Bangladesh National Film Awards. Krishnopokkho (2016) was directed by Meher Afroz Shaon. In October 2016, she announced the production of her next film based on Nokkhotrer Raat. Debi (2018) is produced by a grant from the Government of Bangladesh.

Filmography

Bibliography

 In Bengali

 In English
 1971: A Novel
 In Blissful Hell
 Flowers of Flame
 Gouripur Junction

Translations
The Exorcist by William Peter Blatty

Awards

 Lekhak Shibir Prize (1973)
 Bangla Academy Literary Award (1981)
 Shishu Academy Award
 Zainul Abedin Gold Medal
 Michael Madhusudan Medal (1987)
 Bachsas Award for Best Story (1988)
 Humayun Qadir Memorial Prize (1990)
 Bangladesh National Film Award for Best Story (1994)
 Bangladesh National Film Award for Best Film (1994)
 Bangladesh National Film Award for Best Dialogue (1994)
 Ekushey Padak (1994)
 Sheltech Award (2007)
 Bangladesh National Film Award for Best Screenplay (2007)
 Bangladesh National Film Award for Best Director (2012)
 Bangladesh National Film Award for Best Screenplay (2012)
 Meril-Prothom Alo Award for best director (2013)
 
 Bangladesh National Film Award for Best Dialogue (2015)

References
Footnotes

Citations

Further reading

External links
 

 
Family of Humayun Ahmed
1948 births
2012 deaths
People from Netrokona District
People from Mymensingh District
Dhaka College alumni
University of Dhaka alumni
Academic staff of the University of Dhaka
North Dakota State University alumni
20th-century Bangladeshi male writers
Bangladeshi film directors
Bangladeshi male novelists
Bangladeshi science fiction writers
Bangladeshi short story writers
Bengali detective fiction writers
Bengali-language science fiction writers
Bengali-language writers
International Writing Program alumni
Recipients of Bangla Academy Award
Best Director National Film Award (Bangladesh) winners
Recipients of the Ekushey Padak
Deaths from colorectal cancer
Best Screenplay National Film Award (Bangladesh) winners
Best Dialogue National Film Award (Bangladesh) winners
Best Story National Film Award (Bangladesh) winners
20th-century Bengalis